Fontet is a commune in the Gironde department in Nouvelle-Aquitaine in southwestern France.

It is situated between Bordeaux and Bergerac.

Population

See also
Communes of the Gironde department

References

Communes of Gironde